The 2012 Brisbane International was a joint 2012 ATP World Tour and 2012 WTA Tour tennis tournament, played on outdoor hard courts in Brisbane, Queensland. Because of its ongoing success, the WTA decided in 2011 to upgrade the event to a Premier event. It was the 4th edition of the tournament and took place at the Queensland Tennis Centre in Tennyson. It was held from 1 to 8 January 2012 and was part of the Australian Open Series in preparation for the first Grand Slam of the year. Andy Murray and Kaia Kanepi won the singles titles.

ATP singles main-draw entrants

Seeds

1 Rankings as of 26 December 2011

Other entrants
The following players received wildcards into the singles main draw:
  James Duckworth
  Marinko Matosevic
  Ben Mitchell

The following players received entry from the qualifying draw:
  Jesse Levine
  Igor Andreev
  Tatsuma Ito
  John Millman

Withdrawals
  Kevin Anderson (knee injury)
  James Blake (personal reasons)
  Tommy Haas (calf injury)
  Donald Young (personal reasons)

Retirements
  Florian Mayer (groin injury)

ATP doubles main-draw entrants

Seeds

1 Rankings are as of 26 December 2011

Other entrants
The following pairs received wildcards into the doubles main draw:
  Matthew Ebden /  Chris Guccione
  Greg Jones /  Marinko Matosevic

Withdrawals
  Tommy Haas (calf injury)

WTA singles main-draw entrants

Seeds

1 Rankings as of 26 December 2011

Other entrants
The following players received wildcards into the singles main draw:
  Casey Dellacqua
  Olivia Rogowska

The following players received entry from the qualifying draw:
  Vania King
  Nina Bratchikova
  Vera Dushevina
  Alexandra Panova

Withdrawals
  Maria Sharapova (ankle injury)

Retirements
  Kim Clijsters (left hip injury)
  Polona Hercog (low back injury)
  Ksenia Pervak (migraine)
  Serena Williams (left ankle sprain)

WTA doubles main-draw entrants

Seeds

1 Rankings are as of 26 December 2011

Other entrants
The following pairs received wildcards into the doubles main draw:
  Ashleigh Barty /  Casey Dellacqua
  Dominika Cibulková /  Janette Husárová
  Jelena Janković /  Andrea Petkovic
The following pair received entry as alternates:
  Nina Bratchikova /  Kristina Mladenovic

Withdrawals
  Polona Hercog (low back injury)

Finals

Men's singles

 Andy Murray  defeated  Alexandr Dolgopolov, 6–1, 6–3
It was Murray's 1st title of the year and 22nd of his career.

Women's singles

 Kaia Kanepi defeated  Daniela Hantuchová, 6–2, 6–1
 It was Kanepi's 1st title of the year and the 2nd of her career.

Men's doubles

 Max Mirnyi /  Daniel Nestor defeated  Jürgen Melzer /  Philipp Petzschner, 6–1, 6–2

Women's doubles

 Nuria Llagostera Vives /  Arantxa Parra Santonja defeated  Raquel Kops-Jones /  Abigail Spears,
7–6(7–2), 7–6(7–2)

Broadcast
The 2012 Brisbane International was, for the first time, broadcast live and in full to most states in Australia on digital channel 7Two. In previous years, the event was broadcast only on certain days and often on significant delay on Channel Seven.

References

External links
Official website

 
2012 ATP World Tour
2012 WTA Tour
2012
2012 in Australian tennis
January 2012 sports events in Australia

fr:Open de Brisbane 2012 (ATP)
nl:ATP-toernooi van Brisbane 2012